= Cöln-Frechener Strassenbahn BENZELRATH and MARIA =

Cöln-Frechener Strassenbahn BENZELRATH and MARIA were two locomotives built by Hohenzollern, serial number 846 and 933, in 1895 and 1896. Originally it was named Benzelrath, while later the numbers 4 and 5 were added. In 1904 the CFS was taken over by the Städtische Vorortbahnen Cöln and the units were renumbered 52 and 53. CFS Benzelrath's boiler construction was equal to CFS Maria, although it had different cylinder and wheel sizes. To assist in constructing the ZVTM tramway lines, H.J. te Siepe in Winterswijk (The Netherlands) purchased the locomotives in 1915. The name HENDRIK JAN and RIKA were added to its numbers. The ZVTM rented the locomotives in 1916, until in 1918 the locomotives were sold to brown coal operation Bergerode located in southern Limburg in The Netherlands. Its new owner renumbered the locomotives 39 and 38. In 1919 the locomotives were again sold for the purpose of line construction. This time to the CLS. The new number were 5 and 6. At the take-over of the CLS by the LTM the numbers did not change. In 1921 the locomotives were taken out of service and in 1924 it was scrapped.
